St. John's Church, Northern Liberties was a historic church at 220–230 Brown Street in Philadelphia, Pennsylvania. It was built in 1815 and is one of architect William Strickland's oldest surviving designs.  The same year he also designed the Second Bank of the United States. The church is the seventh oldest surviving church in the state of Pennsylvania, not counting earlier Quaker meetinghouses.

In 1931 the church was consecrated as the Holy Trinity Romanian Orthodox Church and was sold by the Episcopalian parish to the Romanian community in 1972.  Sometime before 1931, a wooden steeple was built above the entrance. In 1983 the church was added to the National Register.

References

Neoclassical architecture in Pennsylvania
Colonial Revival architecture in Pennsylvania
Churches on the National Register of Historic Places in Pennsylvania
Churches completed in 1815
19th-century churches in the United States
Churches in Philadelphia
Northern Liberties, Philadelphia
National Register of Historic Places in Philadelphia
Neoclassical church buildings in the United States